Hendrik Muller Uys (born 2 September 1998) is a South African rugby union player for the  in Super Rugby . His regular position is flanker or number 8.

He signed for the Bulls Super Rugby side for the 2020 Super Rugby season.

References

South African rugby union players
Living people
1998 births
Rugby union flankers
Rugby union number eights
Bulls (rugby union) players
People from Stellenbosch
Blue Bulls players
Rugby union players from the Western Cape